Harry Hunter Wendelstedt Jr. (July 27, 1938 – March 9, 2012) was an umpire in Major League Baseball who worked in the National League from 1966 to 1998. He was born in Baltimore, Maryland. He umpired in the World Series in 1973, 1980, 1986, 1991 and 1995, serving as crew chief in 1980 and 1995. He also officiated in seven National League Championship Series (1970, 1972, 1977, 1981, 1982, 1988, 1990) and four All-Star games (1968, 1976, 1983, 1992), calling balls and strikes in 1976. He umpired in the National League Division Series in 1995, 1996 and 1997. He wore uniform number 21.

Major League Baseball career
Wendelstedt called balls and strikes in five no-hitters, tying an NL record held by Bill Klem. As a home plate umpire, Wendelstedt was known for keeping a wide strike zone. When a batter struck out swinging, he flailed his right arm straight up in the air. When a batter struck out looking, he applied the notorious "chainsaw" move.

On May 31, 1968, Wendelstedt made a call that preserved Los Angeles Dodgers pitcher Don Drysdale's consecutive shutouts and scoreless innings streaks. Giants catcher Dick Dietz came to the plate in the top of the 9th inning with the bases loaded and no outs. On a 2–2 count, Drysdale hit Dietz on the elbow, apparently forcing in a run that would have ended the streaks. However, Wendelstedt ruled that Dietz made no attempt to avoid being struck by the pitch, and called him back. Drysdale retired Dietz on a short fly ball and got out of the inning without yielding a run, earning his fifth straight shutout.

On October 8, 1988, in Game 3 of the 1988 National League Championship Series, Wendelstedt, the crew chief, ejected Los Angeles Dodgers pitcher Jay Howell from the game for having pine tar in his glove after Mets manager Davey Johnson asked the umpires to check Howell. Howell was later suspended for the rest of the series.

Wendelstedt's son, Harry Hunter Wendelstedt III, followed in his father's footsteps and is a current major league umpire. The younger Wendelstedt goes by his middle name of "Hunter" professionally. To honor his father, Hunter also wears uniform number 21.

Umpire training

In 1977, Wendelstedt took over control of the Al Somers Umpire School from its founder (who had trained Wendelstedt), renaming it the Harry Wendelstedt Umpire School.  He ran the school until his death and it continues to bear his name.  His son Hunter now leads the school, located in Ormond Beach, Florida.

Death
Harry Wendelstedt died at the age of 73 on March 9, 2012, after suffering from brain cancer for several years.

See also

 List of Major League Baseball umpires

References

External links
 Retrosheet
 Harry Wendelstedt School for Umpires
 BaseballLibrary - list of articles
 Legacy.com obituary
 
 The Sporting News umpire card

1938 births
2012 deaths
Deaths from brain cancer in the United States
Major League Baseball umpires
Sportspeople from Baltimore
People from Ormond Beach, Florida